Focus on Alternative and Complementary Therapies was a peer-reviewed medical review journal covering complementary and alternative medicine. The journal's founder and editor-in-chief was Edzard Ernst (University of Exeter). Established in 1996, it was published by Wiley-Blackwell on behalf of the Royal Pharmaceutical Society of Great Britain. It was discontinued in 2016.

Abstracting and indexing 
The journal is abstracted and indexed in:

References

External links 
 

Review journals
Quarterly journals
Wiley-Blackwell academic journals
Alternative and traditional medicine journals
Publications established in 1996
English-language journals
Publications disestablished in 2016